Apple juice is a fruit juice made by the maceration and pressing of an apple. The resulting expelled juice may be further treated by enzymatic and centrifugal clarification to remove the starch and pectin, which holds fine particulate in suspension, and then pasteurized for packaging in glass, metal, or aseptic processing system containers, or further treated by dehydration processes to a concentrate. 

Due to the complex and costly equipment required to extract and clarify juice from apples in large volume, apple juice is normally produced commercially. In the United States, unfiltered fresh apple juice is made by smaller operations in areas of high apple production, in the form of unclarified apple cider. Apple juice is one of the most common fruit juices globally, with world production led by China, Poland, the United States, and Germany.

Production
Apples used for apple juice are usually harvested between September and mid-November in the Northern Hemisphere and between February to mid-April in the Southern Hemisphere. A common cultivar used for apple juice is the McIntosh. After the apples are picked, they are washed and transported to the processing facility. The apples are then pressed and juiced right away to avoid spoilage. Depending on the company and end-product, the apples can be processed in different ways before pressing. Apple juice is then filtered, with the number of solid particles remaining partly defining the difference between apple juice and apple cider. In cases where the apple juice is treated enzymatically, the typical class of enzymes used are pectinases.

Pasteurization
Because apple juice is acidic, typically with a pH of 3.4, it can be pasteurized for less time or at lower temperatures than many other juices. For this purpose, the U.S. Food and Drug Administration recommends the following thermal processing times and temperatures in order to achieve a 5-log reduction of Cryptosporidium parvum as this parasite is more heat resistant than E.coli 0157:

 for at least 6 seconds, 
 for at least 2.8 seconds, 
 for at least 1.3 seconds, 
 for at least 0.6 seconds, 
 for at least 0.3 seconds,

Unpasteurized juice and foodborne illnesses
From 2000 to 2010, there were over 1700 cases in North America of illnesses related to drinking unpasteurized juice and ciders. The pathogens related to these food-borne illnesses included parasites, bacteria, and viruses. The most common pathogens were E.coli 0157 and 0111, Salmonella, Cryptosporidium, Clostridium botulinum, and Hepatitis A. Pathogens can be spread in a number of ways, such as contamination where the fruit is grown, being carried in contaminated containers, or due to poor handling and washing.

Composition and nutrition
Apple juice is 88% water and 11% carbohydrates (including 9% sugars), with negligible content of protein or fat. A 100 ml reference amount of unsweetened apple juice supplies 46 calories and no significant content of any micronutrients.

Storage
Fresh apple juice requires refrigeration.  Sealed bottles of canned apple juice can be stored in a dark, cool place, such as a pantry or cupboard, to delay the degradation of the product. The appearance, texture, or taste of the juice might change over time.

Once the juice package is opened, or if it was not sealed and shipped without needing refrigeration by the manufacturer, it must be resealed tightly and refrigerated to avoid contamination from microorganisms such as bacteria.

Apple cider

While apple juice generally refers to the filtered, pasteurised product of apple pressing, an unfiltered and sometimes unpasteurized version of the juice is commonly known as "apple cider" in the United States and parts of Canada.  Seeking to capitalize on this, some makers of filtered and clarified juice (including carbonated varieties) label and sell their product as "apple cider."  Legal distinctions are not universal and elusive to apply.

Elsewhere in the world, particularly in New Zealand, Australia, and the United Kingdom, the simple term cider refers to fermented fruit juice, usually made from apples but also from pears; this alcoholic beverage is known as hard cider in much of North America.

See also

 Juicing
 List of juices
 Malic acid

References

External links

Apple drinks
Fruit juice